The Forest Opera is an open-air amphitheatre located in Sopot, Poland, with a capacity of 5047 seats, the orchestra pit can contain up to 110 musicians.

History
Built in 1909 (when the location was part of Germany), the amphitheatre is used for various entertainment events and shows, including opera performances and song festivals. After World War I and almost till end of World War II it was a place of operatic festivals (Zoppot Festspiele) and Sopot was recognized throughout Europe and frequently labelled as the Bayreuth of the North. During that time, mostly Wagnerian operas and his music dramas were performed regularly each year.

After World War II the Baltic State Opera held few performances each year at the Forest Opera between 1962 and 1977 (Aida in 1962, Halka in 1964, Der Zigeunerbaron in 1965, Swan Lake in 1968, Die Fledermaus in 1977), and sporadically outside this range (Tannhäuser in 2000).

Each year, starting from 1964 (with some interruption in the early 1980s), the Sopot International Song Festival takes place at the Forest Opera, events being organizsd by the Ministry of Culture and Art in cooperation with the Polish Artistic Agency (PAGART). It was a music event transmitted to the Eastern bloc countries via television. Starting in 1994 Telewizja Polska (TVP) became the producer of the festival.

The Forest Opera hosted the 1991 edition of the Miss Polski beauty pageant on 19 July 1991, and was also the venue of Whitney Houston's only live concert in Poland, held on 22 August 1999 as part of her My Love Is Your Love World Tour. On 28 June 2001, the Munich Philharmonic Orchestra under James Levine gave a concert at the Forest Opera.

An attempt was made to reactivate the Sopot Wagner Festival on the 100th anniversary of the Forest Opera's creation (20 July 2009), with the special event of a single concert performance of Das Rheingold, conducted by Jan Latham-Konig – for the first time since the end of the 1930s. The announced intention of the organizers is staging the remaining parts of Der Ring des Nibelungen in Sopot (including some of them in the Forest Opera) within the next few years.

Starting in the fall of 2009 Sopot Forest Opera underwent extensive renovation and modernization.

Performances in Zoppot Festspiele

 1921: Fidelio
 1922: Siegfried
 1924: Die Walküre
 1925: Tannhäuser
 1926: Lohengrin
 1927: Götterdämmerung
 1928: Parsifal
 1929: Die Meistersinger von Nürnberg
 1931: Der Ring des Nibelungen (the cycle without Das Rheingold)
 1932: Lohengrin
 1933: Tannhäuser
 1934: Die Meistersinger von Nürnberg and Die Walküre
 1935: Die Meistersinger von Nürnberg and Rienzi
 1936: Parsifal and Rienzi
 1937: Parsifal and Lohengrin
 1938: Lohengrin and Der Ring des Nibelungen (whole cycle)
 1939: Tannhäuser and Der Ring des Nibelungen (whole cycle)
 1940: Tannhäuser and Der fliegende Holländer
 1941: Die Meistersinger von Nürnberg
 1942: Die Meistersinger von Nürnberg and Siegfried
 1944: Siegfried

Sources 
The Bayreuth of the North by Einhard Luther, in Opera (Autumn, 1966), 7.
 BART Artistic Agency

References

External links 

 The BART Forest Opera
 The Forest Opera in Sopot
 Zoppoter Waldoper: Wagner's operas in Zoppot

Amphitheaters
Opera houses in Poland
Resort architecture in Pomerania
Sopot International Song Festival
Buildings and structures in Sopot
Tourist attractions in Pomeranian Voivodeship
Music venues completed in 1909
1909 establishments in Germany